Elections to the Indiana Senate took place on November 6, 2018. Primary elections were held on May 8, 2018.

Summary of Results

Source:

Close races 
Two districts had a margin of victory under 10%:
District 31, 2.8%
District 25, 7.8%
District 46, 9%

Retiring incumbents
Two incumbent Senators, both Republicans, chose to not seek reelection.
Doug Eckerty (R), District 26
Jim Smith (R), District 45

Incumbents defeated

In primary
One incumbent Republican Senator ran for reelection but was defeated in the May 8 primary.
Joe Zakas (R), District 11

Detailed Results

Sources:

District 1

Democratic primary

Republican primary

General election

District 4

Democratic primary

Republican primary

General election

District 6

Republican primary

Democratic primary

General election

District 11

Republican primary

Democratic primary

General election

District 14

Republican primary

General election

District 15

Republican primary

Democratic primary

General election

District 17

Republican primary

Democratic primary

General election

District 19

Republican primary

General election

District 21

Republican primary

Democratic primary

General election

District 22

Republican primary

Democratic primary

General election

District 23

Republican primary

General election

District 25

Democratic primary

Republican primary

General election

District 26

Republican primary

Democratic primary

General election

District 27

Republican primary

Democratic primary

General election

District 29

Republican primary

Democratic primary

General election

District 31

Republican primary

Democratic primary

General election

District 38

Republican primary

Democratic primary

General election

District 39

Republican primary

General election

District 41

Republican primary

Democratic primary

General election

District 43

Republican primary

General election

District 45

Republican primary

Democratic primary

General election

District 46

Republican primary

Democratic primary

General election

District 47

Republican primary

Democratic primary

General election

District 48

Republican primary

General election

District 49

Republican primary

Democratic primary

General election

References

2018 Indiana elections
Indiana State Senate
Indiana Senate elections